Trichocarenum is a genus of beetles in the family Carabidae, containing the following species:

 Trichocarenum castelnaui Sloane, 1905
 Trichocarenum cylindricum Sloane, 1897
 Trichocarenum elderi Blackburn, 1892

References

Scaritinae